S. glauca may refer to:
 Shorea glauca, a plant species
 Smilax glauca, a woody vine species
 Stypandra glauca, a rhizomatous perennial species widespread across southern areas of Australia

See also
 Glauca (disambiguation)